Craig Tully (born 7 January 1976) is a Scottish football coach and former professional player who is currently manager of Hawick Royal Albert.

Career

Playing career
Born in Stirling, Tully played as a defender for Victoria Juveniles, Dundee, Forfar Athletic, Ross County, Elgin City, Stenhousemuir, Peterhead, Arbroath, East Stirlingshire and Clyde.

Coaching career
After working as a player-coach for Peterhead, Tully was appointed manager of East Stirlingshire in April 2014.

The Shire were relegated in his second season in charge through the Scottish League Two play-offs in May 2016. Shortly after their relegation, Tully left Ochilview Park after his contract was not renewed. Tully was appointed manager of Lowland League club Hawick Royal Albert in September 2017, suffering relegation to the East of Scotland Football League in his first season with the club.

Managerial statistics

References

1976 births
Living people
Scottish footballers
Dundee F.C. players
Forfar Athletic F.C. players
Ross County F.C. players
Elgin City F.C. players
Stenhousemuir F.C. players
Peterhead F.C. players
Arbroath F.C. players
East Stirlingshire F.C. players
Clyde F.C. players
Scottish Football League players
Association football defenders
Scottish football managers
East Stirlingshire F.C. managers
Hawick Royal Albert F.C. managers
Scottish Professional Football League managers